Brandon Patrick George is an American flutist. He studied at the Oberlin Conservatory of Music with Michel Debost, in Paris with Sophie Cherrier, and received a Master of Music degree from the Manhattan School of Music. He was appointed flutist of Imani Winds in 2018, succeeding founder Valerie Coleman. Brandon has appeared as a soloist with the Atlanta Symphony Orchestra, Albany Symphony Orchestra, American Composers Orchestra, and with the Orchestra of St. Luke's chamber ensembles.  Prior to his work as a solo and chamber musician, Brandon performed as a guest with American orchestras including the Los Angeles Philharmonic, Pittsburgh Symphony Orchestra, Orpheus Chamber Orchestra, and the International Contemporary Ensemble. A Resident Artist with Imani Winds at the Mannes School of Music at The New School, Brandon is on the faculty at the Curtis Institute of Music. He plays the Verne Q. Powell platinum flute made for the 1939 World's Fair, which was previously owned by William Kincaid, and displayed in the Metropolitan Museum of Art's Musical Instrument Collection. Brandon's album of works by Johann Sebastian Bach, Pierre Boulez, Kalevi Aho, and Sergei Prokofiev was released by Hänssler Classics in September 2020. He lives in Brooklyn, New York.

References 

Living people
Classical flautists
American classical flautists
American classical musicians
Oberlin Conservatory of Music alumni
Manhattan School of Music alumni
African-American classical musicians
Year of birth missing (living people)
21st-century African-American people